"The Long Arm of the Claw" is the name of several television episodes:
"Long Arm of the Claw", an episode of One Piece
"Long Arm of the Claw", an episode of Quack Pack